Hoseynabad-e Nilgun (also Romanized as Ḩoseynābād-e Nīlgūn and Ḩoseynābād Nīlgun; also known as Sa‘īnābād) is a village in Poshtkuh Rural District, in the Central District of Khash County, Sistan and Baluchestan Province, Iran. At the 2006 census, its population was 231, in 47 families.

References 

Populated places in Khash County